Michela Andrienne Zroho (died ) was an Ivorian football player and manager. She has been a member of the Ivory Coast women's national team.

Club career
Zroho had played for Juventus de Yopougon in Ivory Coast.

International career
Zroho had capped for Ivory Coast at senior level during the 2002 African Women's Championship qualification.

Managerial career
Zroho had been the assistant coach of the Ivory Coast women's national team and the head coach of Juventus de Yopougon in Ivory Coast.

Death
In mid-2018, Zroho had announced to the president of Juventus de Yopougon, Yves Gossé, that she would go to Ghana to improve as a football manager. She eventually ended up going to Tunisia. On 15 January 2019, she was found dead in her room. According to witnesses to the event, she died from asphyxiation in her sleep after forgetting to turn off the firewood, which she had lit due to the low temperatures that were there at that time.

See also
List of Ivory Coast women's international footballers

References

Year of birth missing
2019 deaths
Date of death unknown
Ivorian women's footballers
Ivory Coast women's international footballers
Ivorian football managers
Women's association football managers
Female association football managers
Deaths from asphyxiation
Deaths in Tunisia
Women's association footballers not categorized by position